KOTN may refer to:

 KOTN (FM), a radio station (102.5 FM) licensed to Gould, Arkansas, United States
 KOTN (defunct), a defunct radio station (1490 AM) formerly licensed to Pine Bluff, Arkansas
 The Elder Scrolls IV: Knights of the Nine, an official expansion pack for the role-playing video game The Elder Scrolls IV: Oblivion
 King of the Nerds, an American competition-reality television series
King of the Nerds (UK TV series), a UK version of the show
 The Kingdom of the Netherlands, a constitutional monarchy